Rockey Felker (born February 1, 1953) is a former quarterback, head football coach, and retired as director of player personnel for Mississippi State University, in Starkville, Mississippi after the 2017 season. After serving three different stints and working for four different head coaches at Mississippi State, Felker is considered one of the school's native sons.

Playing career
Felker played quarterback at Mississippi State from 1972 to 1974 under coaches Charley Shira and Bob Tyler after a five-sport career at Haywood High School, Brownsville, Tennessee. Helping lead Mississippi State to a 9–3 season and a win over North Carolina in the 1974 Sun Bowl, Felker continues rank in the program's top ten in multiple passing categories including: passing yardage (#9), pass completions (#10, 207), yards per attempt (#8, 6.98), passing efficiency (#7, 112.65), and touchdown passes (#7, 23). He is also ranked nine in total offense with 3,776 yards and seventh in total touchdowns accounted for with 35 (12 rushing and 23 passing). Felker was named the SEC Player of the Year in 1974 by The Nashville Banner.

Coaching career
After serving as an assistant coach for three years at his alma mater, Felker served in several assistant coach capacities in the South, including Texas Tech University, Memphis State University, and the University of Alabama.  After almost 10 years away from Starkville, Felker was called home to lead his alma mater, which was coming off four straight losing seasons. At 33, Felker was the youngest coach in the country.

Felker started the 1986 season with a bang.  By late October, the Bulldogs were 6–1, and needed only one more win to secure a bowl appearance.  However, they suffered four consecutive blowout losses to Auburn, Alabama, LSU and Ole Miss, during which they scored a total of nine points.  This left the Bulldogs at 6–5.  Still, Felker was the first Mississippi State coach in 30 years to start his career with a winning record.

However, the rough end to 1986 proved to be a harbinger for the remainder of Felker's tenure.  He suffered four losing seasons (4–7, 1–10, 5–6, 5–6) between 1987 and 1990, and only won a total of five games in Southeastern Conference play.  The 1988 season is the second-worst on-field record in modern Bulldogs history.  He was fired at the end of the 1990 season and replaced by Jackie Sherrill.

Since leaving his position as head coach, Felker has enjoyed a successful tenure as an assistant coach.  After coaching at the University of Tulsa, and the University of Arkansas, Felker returned home at the request of Sherrill and remained a staple of the Mississippi State staff under Sylvester Croom and Dan Mullen. In 2017, Felker retired.

Head coaching record

References

1953 births
Living people
American football quarterbacks
Alabama Crimson Tide football coaches
Arkansas Razorbacks football coaches
Memphis Tigers football coaches
Mississippi State Bulldogs football players
Mississippi State Bulldogs football coaches
Texas Tech Red Raiders football coaches
Tulsa Golden Hurricane football coaches
People from Jackson, Tennessee
Players of American football from Tennessee